Tiik is an Estonian language surname meaning pond.  

As of 1 January 2022, 125 men and 150 women in Estonia have the surname Tiik. Tiik is ranked the 596th most common surname for men in Estonia and 523rd for women. The surname Tiik is most common in Saare County, where 4.46 per 10,000 inhabitants of the county bear the surname. 

Notable people bearing the surname Tiik include:

Hans Tiik (1903–1941), judge (:et)
 (1910–1996), economic geographer, librarian and historian
Saima Tiik (born 1957), track and field athlete
Simmu Tiik (born 1959), diplomat 
Sirly Tiik (born 1974), Paralympic track and field athlete

References

Estonian-language surnames